The 2016 All Stars match was the sixth annual representative exhibition All Stars match. For the first time, the match was played between the Indigenous All Stars and a World All Stars team.

Teams

1 - Tyson Frizell was originally selected to play but withdrew due to injury. He was replaced by Jeremy Smith.
2 - Robbie Farah was originally selected to play but withdrew to instead attend Super Bowl 50. He was replaced by Michael Ennis.
3 - Johnathan Thurston was originally selected to play but withdrew to instead participate in the World Club Series. Greg Inglis was handed the captaincy. Tyrone Roberts was moved from the bench to Halfback and Thurston was replaced by Jamie Soward.
4 - Lachlan Maranta was originally selected to play but withdrew due to injury. He was replaced by Jordan Kahu.
5 - Blake Ferguson was originally selected to play but withdrew due to injury. James Roberts was moved from the bench to the Centres and Ferguson was replaced by Edrick Lee.
6 - Nathan Peats was originally selected to play but withdrew due to injury. Ray Thompson was moved from the bench to Hooker and Peats was replaced by Craig Garvey.
7 - Trent Hodkinson was originally selected to play but withdrew. He was replaced by Adam Reynolds.
8 - Sam Burgess was originally selected to play but withdrew and Chris Lawrence was added to the team.
9 - Simon Mannering withdrew due to the birth of his son and was replaced by Ryan Hoffman.
10 - Roger Tuivasa-Sheck withdrew due to injury. Jordan Kahu moved to fullback and Konrad Hurrell was added to the bench.
11 - Chris Grevsmuhl and Alex Johnston were both withdrawn from the squad and replaced by David Fifita and Leilani Latu. Andrew Fifita was promoted to the starting side, with Sam Thaiday shifting to the back row in place of Grevsmuhl. Edrick Lee started on the wing in place of Johnston, with David Fifita and Latu joining the interchange bench.
12 - Matthew Wright and Beau Scott replaced Antonio Winterstein and Paul Gallen.
13 - Chris Lawrence was a last minute withdrawal from the World All Stars line up. He was replaced in the starting side by Martin Taupau. The lateness of Lawrence's withdrawal meant the World All Stars only had a 19-man squad.

World All Star selection
The World All Stars team was planned to feature a minimum of four players each from Australia, New Zealand and England, while the remaining players were planned to be made up from other nations such as Fiji, Samoa, Tonga, PNG and France. However, only three New Zealand players were selected. The World All Stars team had to include at least one player – and a maximum of two players - from each NRL club. The Australia, New Zealand and England captains were planned to be automatic selections for the team, however Super League players were not available for selection which included the English captain.

* - Chris Lawrence was a last minute withdrawal. Due to the lateness he was not replaced.

Result

Women's All Stars match

For the fifth time, a Women's match was held as part of the fixture.

Women's Teams

Result
The Women's All Stars exhibition match was held as a curtain raiser for the men's 2016 All Stars match and was won by the NRL Women's All Stars.

References

All Stars Match
Rugby league in Brisbane
NRL All Stars match